TMO may refer to:

 T-Mobile, a German telecommunication company
 Table Mountain Observatory, California
 Tenant management organisation, an organisation set up under United Kingdom law
 Thermo Electron, former NYSE ticker
 Thermo Fisher Scientific, American firm which trades on the NYSE as TMO
 Tortugas Mountain Observatory, New Mexico, USA
 Television Match Official, a rugby official who assists the referee if uncertain to make a decision (see Rugby union match officials)
 Traffic Management Order, an order made by a United Kingdom local authority under the Road Traffic Regulation Act 1984
 Trainman Operated Crossing, a type of level crossing
 Transition-Metal Oxide (see also Surface properties of transition metal oxides)
 Traditional Martinist Order (see Martinists)
 Trunked Mode Operation (see Digital Mobile Radio)